Skating on Thin Ice was a short-lived Australian celebrity reality television programme broadcast on the Nine Network in 2005. Hosted by Jamie Durie, nine celebrities learnt to skate with the ultimate goal being to perform with Disney on Ice, with proceeds going toward children's charity, CanTeen.

Nine revived the concept more successfully in 2006 as Torvill and Dean's Dancing on Ice, also hosted by Durie.

Contestants
The celebrities included:
 Deni Hines – singer
 Kim Kilbey – presenter
 Imogen Bailey – model
 James Blundell – singer
 Belinda Green – former beauty queen
 Regina Bird – Big Brother 3 winner
 Vince Sorrenti – comedian
 David Whitehill – presenter of Hot Source
 Peter Everett – presenter and home designer

See also 
 List of Australian television series
 List of Nine Network programs

References

External links

2000s Australian reality television series
Nine Network original programming
Figure skating on television
2005 Australian television series debuts
2005 Australian television series endings